The Green Party (SZ) leadership election of 2020 was held on 25 January 2020 when the Green Party elected its co-leaders. Petr Štěpánek, Michal Berg and Petr Globočník ran for the position of male co-leader while Magdalena Davis and Anna Gümplová ran for position of female co-leader. Michal Berg and Magdalena Davis received highest number of votes and were elected.

Background
Petr Štěpánek was elected leader of Green Party on 20 January 2018 following party's loss in 2017 legislative election. The party has since changed its statute so it will be led by co-leaders, one male and one female. Štěpánek decided to run for the position of male leader. Petr Globočník and Michal Berg announced their decisions to challenge Štěpánek. Magdalena Davis and Anna Gümplová submitted candidacies for the female leader.

Voting

Female

Male

References

Green Party (Czech Republic) leadership elections
Green Party leadership election
Green Party (Czech Republic) leadership election
Indirect elections
Green Party (Czech Republic) leadership election